Embroidery thread is yarn that is manufactured or hand-spun specifically for embroidery and other forms of needlework. Embroidery thread often differs widely, coming in many different fiber types, colors and weights.

Threads for hand embroidery include:

Crewel yarn is a fine 2-ply yarn of wool or, less often, a wool-like acrylic.
Embroidery floss or stranded cotton is a loosely twisted, slightly glossy 6-strand thread, usually of cotton but also manufactured in silk, linen, and rayon. Cotton floss is the standard thread for cross-stitch. Extremely shiny rayon floss is characteristic of Brazilian embroidery. Historically, stranded silk embroidery threads were described as sleaved or sleided in the sixteenth century. 
Filoselle is a historical term for embroidery floss made using the leftover waste from reeled silk.
Matte embroidery cotton (or its French name) is a matte-finish (not glossy) twisted 5-ply thread.
Medici or broder medici is a fine, light-weight wool thread formerly manufactured by DMC Group.
Perle cotton, pearl cotton, or French coton perlé is an S-twisted, 2-ply thread with high sheen, sold in five sizes or weights (No. 3, 5, 8, 12 and 16 (Finca), with 3 being the heaviest and 16 the finest).
Persian yarn is a loosely twisted 3-strand yarn of wool or acrylic, often used for needlepoint.
Silk floss is available in two different types: flat, which has no twist, or only the slightest amount,  and twisted.
Tapestry yarn or tapestry wool is a tightly twisted 4-ply yarn.

Threads for machine embroidery are usually of polyester or rayon (less often cotton or silk).

Threads, like textiles, can contain compounds that may be harmful to humans. Many dyes have been shown to be allergenic and in some cases carcinogenic. Testing for the presence of these dyes, and other residual substances, can be done at many commercial laboratories.

Certification to the Oeko-tex standard may also be applied for. This tests the component for over 100 different chemicals and certifies the component according to human ecological safety.

References

Citations

Bibliography
Reader's Digest Complete Guide to Needlework. The Reader's Digest Association, Inc. (March 1992). 

Embroidery
Yarn